Baruch Osnia (19 September 1905 – 6 July 1994) was an Israeli politician who served as a member of the Knesset between 1951 and 1969.

Biography
Osnia was born Baruch Eisenstadt in Pinsk in the Russian Empire (now in Belarus) to Samuel Eisenstadt and Zipora Finfelstein. He was educated at a heder and a high school in Danzig (now Gdańsk), before studying at the University of Königsberg. He returned to Danzig to work as a lawyer and was a member of Habonim. In 1929, he became secretary of the central committee of the German branch of Poale Zion.

In 1933, Osnia made aliyah to Mandatory Palestine and was a high school teacher in  kibbutz Givat Haim. He was on the Mapai list for the 1949 elections, but did not win a seat. However, he entered the Knesset on 12 February 1951 as a replacement for Abba Hushi, who had resigned. He retained his seat in the July 1951 elections, and was re-elected in 1955, 1959, 1961 and 1965, by which time Mapai had formed the Alignment alliance. He lost his seat in the 1969 elections.

He died in 1994.

References

External links

1905 births
1994 deaths
People from Gdańsk
Belarusian Jews
Jews from the Russian Empire
Emigrants from the Russian Empire to Germany
Jewish emigrants from Nazi Germany to Mandatory Palestine
University of Königsberg alumni
Israeli schoolteachers
Poale Zion politicians
Mapai politicians
Israeli Labor Party politicians
Alignment (Israel) politicians
20th-century German lawyers
Members of the 1st Knesset (1949–1951)
Members of the 2nd Knesset (1951–1955)
Members of the 3rd Knesset (1955–1959)
Members of the 4th Knesset (1959–1961)
Members of the 5th Knesset (1961–1965)
Members of the 6th Knesset (1965–1969)